John Knowlton may refer to:

 John James Knowlton (1841–1903), member of the Wisconsin State Assembly
 John S.C. Knowlton (1798–1871), American newspaper editor, publisher and politician in Massachusetts